Central Technical School (CTS or Central Tech) is a Canadian composite high school in Toronto, Ontario. The school is run by the Toronto District School Board (TDSB); before 1998, it was run by the Toronto Board of Education (TBE).

Central Tech is located in the Harbord Village neighborhood of downtown Toronto. The campus address is 725 Bathurst Street. The school has three buildings. The main building is southernmost; it includes the school office and numerous classrooms.

Central Tech offers a wide range of programs, including all the core academic courses, as well as concentrations and specializations in visual arts and technical studies. The school also offers enriched levels and special education, including a resource room for students with learning disabilities. As well, the school offers support to students in the transition from high school to university, college, apprenticeship or employment.

Central Tech is also one of the TDSB's night-school locations. Two nights per week, the school offers various high-school courses, both to teenagers and to adults, at no charge.

War effort
During the Second World War, Central Tech's facilities were put to use 24 hours a day. From 9:00 a.m. to 3:30 p.m, students attended regular classes. From 4:00 p.m. to 7:30 a.m., in cooperation with the United States, special classes were held under the supervision of the Army, Navy and Royal Canadian Air Force. These classes involved marching drills, wireless operating, aircraft mechanics, flight, tank repair, and other subjects related to the war effort.

Film and television location
Several films and television series have used the school as a location, including; 
 Good Will Hunting
 Flashpoint
 Resident Evil: Apocalypse
 Class of 1984
 Silent Hill: Revelation 3D
 Loser
 Baroness von Sketch Show

Notable alumni
 Mario Barone, Canadian soccer player
Aba Bayefsky, artist and teacher at the Ontario College of Art
 Adriano Belli, CFL player for the Toronto Argonauts
 Tristan Black, CFL player for the Calgary Stampeders
 Bruno Bobak, Canadian war artist
 Nina Bunjevac, Serbian Canadian cartoonist
 George Cassian, yacht designer
 Susan Collett, artist
 Ken Bell, WW2 Photographer
 Lawren Harris, painter and member of the Group of Seven
 his son Lawren P. Harris was also an alumnus and painter
 Eileen Hazell, sculptor and potter
 Leon Katz, physicist, member of the Order of Canada
 Terry Mosher, Montreal-based political cartoonist
 Sydney Newman, television and film producer
 Haruko Okano, artist
 Michael Smith, decathlete, CBC color commentator
 Frank Stukus, Toronto Argonauts player and Grey Cup champion

See also

 List of high schools in Ontario

References

External links

 School website
 Stadium website
 Campus overview map
 TechEd sub-site
 Alumni association

Education in Toronto
High schools in Toronto
Educational institutions established in 1915
1915 establishments in Ontario